Journey to Saturn is a 2008 Danish adult computer-animated science fiction comedy film, directed by  Thorbjørn Christoffersen and Craig Frank. It was produced by A. Film A/S and loosely based on Claus Deleuran's comic from 1977 of the same name. The film revolves around a group of Danish astronauts who journey to Saturn on a quest for natural resources.

The film also depicts and mocks several Danish stereotypes and characters, like the royal family, the (at the time) Danish prime minister Anders Fogh Rasmussen, Extreme right-wing politician Mogens Glistrup, Danish therapist Carl Mar Møller, Muslim immigrants, American yeehaw's, Jesus, and Danish lack of style and presentability in general.

Plot
A corporate-backed rocket takes off from Denmark to explore and conquer Saturn for natural resources. The crew consists of wannabe astronaut Per Jensen, military instructor and hardliner Sgt. Arne Skrydsbøl, supply officer Fisse-Ole (Pussy-Ole), tour chef and caterer Jamil Ahmadinejad volunteering because he failed his nationality test (and gets another chance), and two pilots.

Upon arrival, the crew makes contact with aliens but it becomes apparent that the chief of the Danish corporation wishes to conspire with the aliens to sell off all the water on Earth (except Greenland). The mission was meant to fail, and the astronauts were never meant to return home. The aliens clear out the Earth spaceship and head to Earth on the way looking into some of the loot from Earth - including a video film they believe to be instructions on friendly Earth greetings, but being in fact a German pornographic movie involving large sausages.

The astronauts are left for dead in space, but fall through a black hole and land in Heaven where they get some support. Leaving Heaven guided by the Holy Spirit in the form of a dove, they refuel and make it back to the Moon where they encounter some US astronauts in their secret lunar missile base (including a redneck campervan, shotguns and barbecue). The team then use a US space-based surveillance system to find the centre of the water theft conspiracy back on Earth. The crew return to Earth and rescue a hostage scientist (Per Jensen's girlfriend) at the installation after an gunfight with. They defeat an alien monster with a keg of beer in a manner similar to that in Jaws and escape the installation just in time as it is destroyed by a nuclear bomb, sent from the Moon.

Voice cast

Casper Christensen as Per Jensen
Frank Hvam as Sergeant Arne Skrydsbøl
Ali Kazim as Jamil Ahmadinejad
Simon Jul Jørgensen as Pussy-Ole
Iben Hjejle as Susanne Mortensen: Chief technical flight director
Lars Hjortshøj as Ib
Bjarke Søballe Andersen as  Crowd
Kresten Vestbjerg Andersen as  Drunk
Peter Belli as Alien Dictator
Rasmus Bjerg as Agent 2
Klaus Bondam as Kurt Maj: A businessman
Thorbjørn Christoffersen as General
Tine Clasen as Crowd
Claus Darholt as Assistant
Tobias Dybvad as the Prime Minister
Craig Frank as Afro-American Astronaut
Morten Pilegaard Jespersen as Crowd
Roberto Johansson as Jørgen from Hundige Shortwave Radio Club
Karsten Kiilerich as German Peasant
Henrik Koefoed as Doctor & Alien Researcher
Flemming Krøll as Prince Henrik
Tilde Landgreen as Small girl
Jørgen Lerdam as Liberal Journalist
Anders Lund Madsen as Reserve Jesus
Justin Murphy as Redneck Astronaut
Kjeld Nørgaard as Skt. Peter
Esben Pretzmann as Alien Soldier
Lasse Rimmer as TV Reporter / Gert
Ask Rostrup as Intercom voice
Sidsel Rostrup as Angel
Puk Scharbau as German peasant girl
Jonas Schmidt as Agent 1
Regitze Stampe as Crowd
Martin Wichmann as Tax cheater

External links
 Official site (In Danish) 
 

2008 science fiction films
2008 films
2008 computer-animated films
Animated films about extraterrestrial life
2000s Danish-language films
Danish science fiction films
Adult animated films
Animated films based on comics
Films based on Danish comics
Danish animated films